Patrick Dunne may refer to:
 Patrick Dunne (priest) (1818–1900), Roman Catholic priest in Australia
 Pat Dunne (American football) (active 1920–1921), American football player
 Pat Dunne (1943–2015), Irish football goalkeeper
 Paddy Dunne (Gaelic footballer) (1929–2013), Irish Gaelic football player
 Paddy Dunne (politician) (1928–2006), Irish Labour Party politician, senator and Lord Mayor of Dublin
 Pecker Dunne (Patrick Dunne, 1933–2012), Irish singer and musician

See also
Pat Dunn (disambiguation)
Patrick Dunn (disambiguation)